The Holland III was an early prototype submarine made by John Holland.  The 16-foot 1-ton model was a scaled-down version of the Fenian Ram intended for experiments to help him improve navigation.

In a dispute over money, the prototype was stolen from its slip in the Morris Canal Basin, on the Hudson River in Jersey City, New Jersey, by members of the Fenian Brotherhood in November, 1883.   The theft also included the Fenian Ram, a successful submarine they had commissioned.  The Fenian Brotherhood stole away with the two submarines up the East River in New York City.  The Fenian Ram was tied to their boat, and the Holland III was tied to the Ram.  Near Whitestone Point in Queens, New York, the Holland III started to take on water through her turret, causing her to slow down, stretching and subsequently breaking the rope between it and the Fenian Ram. The prototype soon sank in 110 feet of water, and has not been recovered, despite efforts, most recently by the National Underwater and Marine Agency.

The Fenians had been planning to use it to fight Britain for the independence of Ireland.

References

19th-century submarines of the United States
Irish-American history
John Philip Holland
Shipwrecks of the East River